Vitória Longaray Strada (born 12 October 1996) is a Brazilian actress and model.

Career

In 2008, Strada began her modeling career. She finished in second place in the Miss World contest in 2014. In 2015, she began studying Performing Arts at the Federal University of Rio Grande do Sul, and made her film debut in Real Beleza, where she portrayed Maria. In 2017, Strada made her first television appearance by playing Tayla on an episode of the TV series Werner E Os Mortos. Later that same year, she got the main part of the telenovela Tempo de Amar. In 2018, Strada played another main role in Espelho da Vida, portraying three characters: Julia Castelo, Cris Valência and Beatriz.

References

External links 
 

1996 births
Living people
Brazilian female models
Brazilian bisexual people
People from Porto Alegre
Brazilian LGBT actors
Bisexual actresses
Bisexual women
Actresses from Rio Grande do Sul
21st-century Brazilian actresses